Far upstream element-binding protein 1 is a protein that in humans is encoded by the FUBP1 gene.

This gene encodes a ssDNA binding protein that activates the far upstream element (FUSE) of c-myc and stimulates expression of c-myc in undifferentiated cells. Regulation of FUSE by FUBP occurs through single-strand binding of FUBP to the non-coding strand. This protein has been shown to function as an ATP-dependent DNA helicase.

Interactions
Far upstream element-binding protein 1 has been shown to interact with MAPK14 and SMN1.

Clinical Significance
FUBP1 gene deletion forms part of the 1p/19q codeletion mutation seen in oligodendroglioma, a form of primary brain tumour. CIC gene is also lost in the 1p/19q codeletion mutation.

References

Further reading